There have been two baronetcies created for members of the Pepperell family, both in the Baronetage of Great Britain. Both creations are extinct.

The Pepperell Baronetcy, of Boston, Massachusetts, was created in the Baronetage of Great Britain on 15 November 1746 for the merchant and soldier William Pepperell, in recognition of him organizing, financing and leading the 1745 expedition that captured the French garrison at Fortress Louisbourg during King George's War. The title became extinct on his death in 1759.

The Pepperell Baronetcy, of Boston, Massachusetts, was created in the Baronetage of Great Britain on 9 November 1774 for William Pepperell. Born William Sparhawk, he was the grandson of the first Baronet of the 1746 creation. He was the adopted heir of his grandfather and succeeded to Pepperell's estates on the condition that he adopted the surname Pepperell in lieu of Sparhawk. He was proscribed in the Massachusetts Banishment Act of 1778. The title became extinct on his death in 1816.

Pepperell baronets, of Boston (1746)
Sir William Pepperell, 1st Baronet (1696–1759)

Pepperell baronets, of Boston (1774)
Sir William Pepperell, 1st Baronet (died 1816)

References

 George Edward Cokayne, The Complete Baronetage, volume V (1906) pp. 93–94, 183

Extinct baronetcies in the Baronetage of Great Britain